Abdurrahman Lermi (born 1986), better known as Apolas Lermi, is a Turkish folksinger and musician.

Biography
He was born in Tonya, Turkey. His real name is Abdurrahman Lermi. Apolas is a nickname his friends gave to him and has been used for his stage name.
Lermi has migrated to İstanbul with his family at age of 10. After a long musician time, he decided to publish an album related with Black Sea culture.

Apolas Lermi, who generally performs Turkish folk songs, published his first album named Kalandar in 2011, which had Pontic Greek songs that have been almost forgotten in Black Sea region. Kalandar means the first month of the new year in traditional calendar. Also it means the general entertainments made on 13th-14 January. Featured songs of this album: Mektup, Ağapo Se, Yağmur, Seçim Zamanı, Ağasar Horonu.

The video clip of Ağapo Se was filmed at Sumela Monastery. This clip is also the first one made in Romeika and filmed in Sumela Monastery. Seçim Zamanı song from this album has become a project called Diren Karadeniz with participation of 24 singers. This project mentions about social, political and cultural problems in Black Sea region of Turkey.

Lermi, has prepared a TV program called Kalandar in 2012 and pointed out traditional Black Sea music. The songs of Lermi, who performs traditional songs he has learned from bards of Black Sea, have been used in many TV series and movies.

Santa is Apolas Lermi's second solo album published in 2014. Santa is also a village in Gümüşhane, now called Dumanlı.

Lermi has joined army after this album. When he returned, he filmed some of his songs. Featured songs of this album: Eski Yar, Felek, Beşikdüzü, Karadeniz, Tonton, Yaban Eller, Kaderim Böyle İmiş, Görele Horonu.

Apolas Lermi published an archive album called Romeika in 2016, which is full of Pontic Greek songs and is for breaking down prejudices in Turkey. This album has been published simultaneously in Greece and Turkey. It is much more plain compared with previous albums.

In this album, Lermi has made a duet with Pela Nikolaidou, who is also a Black Sea rooted musician. Vahit Tursun, the writer of Romeika Dictionary (Pontic Greek), vocalized his own poetry in this album. The drawings inside this album belong to Muzaffer Oruçoğlu, who is a writer and painter.

Lermi made only one video clip of this album, for the song Laison , in Istanbul, 2016.

Apolas Lermi prepared Trabzonspor's official song in 2017.

Apolas Lermi has published his 4th album called Momoyer in 2018. Momoyer is a winter festival in Trabzon and similar to the ones celebrated in worldwide. It is a folk theater performed by a group of disguised people singing and dancing.

Lermi has made a video clip of the song Bir Baktım from this album, which was his first traditional dance clip. Senan Kardian Apes Pontic Greek song was also filmed in Cape Jason historical place, Ordu. He also made a video clip of Uzungöl Şerah song, to take attention to the nature pollution in Uzungöl. Another song Dünya was filmed in Akdamar Island, Van.
Kanlı Hemşin, Memleket, Ah Almanya, Karayemiş Ağacı are some other popular songs of this album.

Lermi made a duet with Sait Uçar, one of lyra music leaders. He also made works and concerts with Matthaios Tsahouridis, a Greek musician with Black Sea roots. He also performed a Zaza song called Hal Yamano with Mikail Aslan, a musician working on Zaza culture. The video clip of the song was filmed in Trabzon, Rize and Tunceli. This project is the first work in means of connecting Black Sea and Zaza culture.

Apolas Lermi has been publishing his singles on digital platforms. Aşk Denizi, Akşam Oldu Karanlık, Seni de Unuturum, Kalanima Deresi are some of them. Lermi has been continuing his stage life and art works.

References

External links

Apolas Lermi's YouTube Channel

People from Trabzon
Turkish people of Greek descent
Turkish folk singers
Turkish folk musicians
Living people
1986 births
Greek Muslims